Archery at the 2013 Southeast Asian Games were held between December 12–17. Ten events took place, all being staged at Wunna Theikdi Archery Field.

Medal table

Medal summary

Recurve

Compound

Results

Men's

Individual compound

Qualification round
December 14

Knockout round
December 15

Team compound

Qualification round
December 14

Knockout round
December 17

Individual recurve

Qualification round
December 14

Knockout round
December 15

Team recurve

Qualification round
December 14

Knockout round
December 17

Women's

Individual compound

Qualification round
December 14

Knockout round
December 15

Team compound

Qualification round
December 14

Knockout round
December 17

Individual recurve

Qualification round
December 14

Knockout round
December 15

Team recurve

Qualification round
December 14

Knockout round
December 17

Mixed

Team compound

Qualification round
December 14

 Replace Daophasouk Detsone

Knockout round
December 16

Team recurve

Qualification round
December 14

 Replace Farah Amalina Azhar

Knockout round
December 16

References

2013 Southeast Asian Games events
Archery at the Southeast Asian Games
2013 in archery
Archery competitions in Myanmar